Vovkovyntsi is an urban-type settlement in Khmelnytskyi Raion (district) of Khmelnytskyi Oblast in western Ukraine. It hosts the administration of Vovkovyntsi urban hromada, one of the hromadas of Ukraine. The settlement's population was 2,909 as of the 2001 Ukrainian Census and 

Vovkovyntsi was first founded in 1659, and it received the status of an urban-type settlement in 1957.

Until 18 July 2020, Vovkovyntsi belonged to Derazhnia Raion. The raion was abolished in July 2020 as part of the administrative reform of Ukraine, which reduced the number of raions of Khmelnytskyi Oblast to three. The area of Derazhnia Raion was merged into Khmelnytskyi Raion.

See also
 Lozove, the other urban-type settlement in the Derazhnia Raion of Khmelnytskyi Oblast

References

Urban-type settlements in Khmelnytskyi Raion
Populated places established in 1659
1659 establishments in the Polish–Lithuanian Commonwealth
17th-century establishments in Ukraine
Letichevsky Uyezd